The Capital City Symphony (CCS) is a community orchestra based in Washington, D.C. It is one of the founding arts partners in the Atlas Performing Arts Center, located in Northeast DC’s Atlas District.

The orchestra was founded in 1967 by Louis Fantasia as the Georgetown Symphony Orchestra. In 2006, the orchestra relocated from Georgetown to the Atlas. The group’s current name was adopted at the same time.

The Conductor and Artistic Director is Victoria Gau, who is also the associate conductor of the National Philharmonic. Previous conductors: Louis Fantasia, Daniel Hornstein, and John Welsh.

The stated mission of CCS is to make great orchestral music approachable by presenting affordable concerts to the public, performing innovative programs in a relaxed format, and providing a musical outlet for talented amateur and professional players.

CCS regularly accompanies gifted young performers from the Levine School of Music and the Novik Piano Competition.

The orchestra's community outreach efforts include annual family concerts and Christmas Carol sing-a-long.

References

External links 
 CapitalCitySymphony.org 

Symphony orchestras
American orchestras
Musical groups established in 1967
1967 establishments in Washington, D.C.
Musical groups from Washington, D.C.
Performing arts in Washington, D.C.